Pokkiri is a 2007 Indian Tamil-language action film directed by Prabhu Deva. It is the Tamil remake of the 2006 Telugu film Pokiri starring Mahesh Babu. The film stars Vijay and Asin with Prakash Raj, Nassar, Mukesh Tiwari, Vadivelu, Sriman and Napoleon playing supporting roles. Mumaith Khan and Prabhu Deva make guest appearances. Nirav Shah handled cinematography while Kola Bhaskar was the film's editor. Filming took place in India and Australia. Set in Chennai, the film revolves around a thug, Tamizh, willing to do anything for the sake of money, including killing. His killer instincts help him win the attention of two rival gangs, out of which he joins one and helps its members finish off their rivals. On the other hand, he also attempts to save his girlfriend, who disapproves of his violent behavior, from a corrupt cop hellbent on marrying her against her will.

The film was released theatrically on 12 January 2007 and received generally positive reviews with praise for its action sequences, screenplay and score. It became a commercial success, running for more than 200 days at the Tamil Nadu box office. Six years later, it was dubbed in Hindi as Wanted Baghi and it was also dubbed in Odia as Wanted Police.

Plot 
The city of Chennai is rife with the nefarious activities of land mafia. There are two rival gangs: one under Ali Bhai, who resides in Dubai where he controls the India operations through his brothers Guru and Korattur Logu as well as his girlfriend Mona; and another operated by a local goon named Narasimhan. They threaten builders and landowners into giving them protection money or property through force, extortion, or murder. Mohammed Maideen Khan IPS takes charge as the new Police Commissioner of Chennai and starts cracking down on crime.
Tamizh, a thug, is abducted by Logu and his henchmen. Tamizh has taken a contract from Narasimhan to beat up Logu, which he does. However, Guru and Mona invite Tamizh to join their gang. Tamizh declines stating that he does not work for any gang, but is ready to do anything for money. Meanwhile, Tamizh falls in love with Shruthi, an aerobic teacher, when he visits his friend Saravanan's aerobics class, but she mistakes him for a pervert. Shruthi lives with her widowed mother Lakshmi and younger brother Pappu. Body Soda, a bogus kung fu master, lives above Shruthi's house and frequently, albeit comically and unsuccessfully, tries to convince her to marry him. Govindan is a corrupt police inspector in the colony where Tamizh and Shruthi live and is on Ali Bhai's payroll. He lusts for Shruthi and decides to make her his mistress, even after she rejects him multiple times.

Tamizh's first assignment with Ali Bhai's gang is to kill a member of Narasimhan's gang. However, police show up at the spot where Tamizh and the other gangsters are waiting. Tamizh engages the cops long enough for the others to finish the task and flee. He also helps Shruthi escape from Govindan. She is impressed by his kindness, and a friendship soon blossoms between the two, leading to the development of unspoken romantic feelings for each other. When Shruthi tries to express her feelings to Tamizh, they are attacked by members of Narasimhan's gang, whom Tamizh finishes off. Shruthi is shocked to learn that Tamizh is a cold-blooded gangster with no qualms about killing people. Later, Govindan arranges for some thugs to pretend to assault Shruthi so that no decent family will want to take her as their daughter-in-law, as a result of which with no other option, Shruthi and Lakshmi will accept his demands. Tamizh learns of this and thrashes Govindan incognito. After much ado and mental anguish, Shruthi accepts Tamizh's love. Soon, Guru is found dead, presumably killed by Narasimhan in retaliation against the death of his gang members at the hands of Tamizh earlier, which forces Ali Bhai to come to Chennai from Dubai and kill Narasimhan. He also meets Tamizh to discuss the killing of a minister by blowing up a school. Tamizh disagrees with Ali Bhai's method as it would involve killing innocents including women and children.

In the middle of their argument, the police raids the club and arrests Ali Bhai. His gang members retaliate by kidnapping Maidenn's daughter, drugging her, and creating a lewd video of her which they threaten to release to the media if Ali Bhai is not released, forcing the embattled commissioner to release Ali Bhai. However, in her drugged state, Maideen's daughter reveals that her father had placed an undercover officer as a mole in Ali Bhai's gang. The gang members find out that an IPS police officer by the name of Satyamoorthy, the son of a retired police inspector Shanmugavel, has gone undercover to finish off the underworld mafia gangs and is now a part of their gang. Ali Bhai kills Saravanan, believing he is Satyamoorthy. However, it is revealed that Saravanan was actually Shanmugavel's adopted son. Ali Bhai then kills Shanmugavel to lure the real Satyamoorthy. When Satyamoorthy actually turns up, everyone, especially Shruthi and Govindan, are shocked to see that he is Tamizh. Satyamoorthy had gone undercover by posing himself as a Thamizh. It is further revealed that Satyamoorthy was the one who killed Guru and not Narasimhan. He killed Guru under the Commissioner's direction. After Shanmugavel and Saravanan's funerals, Satyamoorthy forces Govindan to call Ali Bhai to find out his location, which is Binny Mills. He goes there and starts to kill Ali Bhai's gang members one by one, rescuing the commissioner's daughter in the process. In a final confrontation, Satyamoorthy thrashes and kills Ali Bhai by slashing his throat with a broken glass window, following which he shoots Govindan and says the following words: Oru vaati mudivu panniten na, yaen pecha naanae kekamaatten.

Cast

Production

Development 
After his film Aathi in January 2006, for nearly six months Vijay was listening to stories, but none had appealed; he was supposed to do a Tamil Remake of Dharani's Bangaram, until that film's failure made him look at other options. That's when he got to watch the Telugu Pokiri – he felt that it would work. After difficulty in finding directors, Prabhudeva was selected as director, directing his first film in Tamil after the failure of his Telugu film Pournami.

Filming 
The movie was launched on 6 July 2006. Vijay's father SAC conducted special puja at the Sri Arunachaleswarar Temple in Tiruvannamalai. On Saturday night, which was the full moon day, an auspicious occasion for the presiding deity there, he spent a full hour before the Lord seeking his blessings. He also prayed at the Sacred Church at Velankanni. Asin was selected, pairing with Vijay for the second time after Sivakasi (2005).

The first day of shoot for the film was held at the new Pillayar Kovil at AVM studios, with various dignitaries gracing the occasion. Vijay's mother Shobha Chandrasekhar gave the clap for the first shot. The first scene shot was with Asin and Vijay, the lead pair in the film, in an elevator that was specially designed for the film. Principal photography was completed in late November.

Music 
The soundtrack has 8 songs composed by Mani Sharma. Two of the songs from the original Telugu version were retained and remade in Tamil. The soundtrack also features a remix of the song "Vasantha Mullai" from Sarangadhara (1958).

Release

Theatrical 
The film was released on 12 January 2007 at the festival of Pongal weekend, alongside Ajith's Aalwar and Vishal's Thaamirabharani. The USA's premiere happened on 11 January 2007, a day before its worldwide release. The film grossed 6.1 crore in Tamil Nadu in opening week from 142 screens.

In 2019, the film also had a limited re-release on the occasion of Vijay's birthday.

Distribution 

Home media 
The satellite rights were bought by Sun TV. Ayngaran International released the DVD of the film in 2008. The film also had a Blu-ray release in United Kingdom on 21 June 2009.

Reception

Box office 
The film was commercial success and ran for over 200 days in Tamil Nadu. The film completed a 50-day run in 146 centres and a 100-day run in 60 centres. The film completed a 175-day run in 15 centres, and a 275-day run at one theatre. The film ran for 100 days in one centre at Kerala. The film was the third highest grossing Tamil film at that time in Kerala box office after Chandramukhi and Anniyan.

Critical response 
The Hindu wrote, "After watching the Telugu Pokkiri, one wondered how it could be rehashed to suit Vijay. Well, kudos to Prabhu Deva for doing a fine job of the remake". Sify said that the film was "enjoyable while it lasts". Indiaglitz stated that Vijay stole the show with his "typical 'Vijayisms' (action, humor and punch dialogues)" and that the show was "action-packed entertainer". Behindwoods review felt that Vadivelu and Prakash Raj's performances were lackluster, and stated that Raj " might do well to sit back and analyze the roles that he accepts," but concluded that the movie overall "packs a punch." Rediff.com gave the movie two stars, stating "there's nothing more tedious than a badly made remake." Nowrunning.com stated that "Pokkiri is attractively packaged and presented". Oneindia.in stated that "Pokkiri is a full length action movie of Vijay." Ananda Vikatan rated the film 42 out of 100.

Accolades

Legacy 
Some of the quotes from the film that became popular were: "Vada Poche", "Plan Panni Pannanum" spoken by Vadivelu and Vijay's dialogue "Oru Vaati Mudivu Panta, Yen Pecha Naane Kekka Maaten" became popular. One of Vadivelu's dialogue "Vada Poche" inspired a comedy show in Sun Music with same name. The dialogue also inspired a song sung by Velmurugan and Powerstar Srinivasan in Arya Surya (2013).  Other dialogue of Vadivelu, "Plan Panni Pannanum" also inspired a film of the same name.

The intro fight scene was shown in the Malayalam film Daddy Cool (2009). The scenes from the film were parodied in Thamizh Padam as hero being an undercover cop. The song "Pokkiri Pongal" is mentioned during the song "Adada" in Pokkiri Simon (2017), where Asin's jogging scene is also parodied. Vijay's dialogue before entry fight "Nee adicha piece naan adicha mass"() is referenced in the Shylock (2020) Malayalam movie during Mammootty's second entry fight. Nelson acknowledged Pokkiri as an inspiration for his directorial Beast (2022). Pokkiri was also parodied in the Star Vijay comedy series Lollu Sabha, in an episode named Bakery.

References

External links 
 

2007 films
2007 action films
Tamil remakes of Telugu films
Films directed by Prabhu Deva
2000s Tamil-language films
Indian action films
Films scored by Mani Sharma
Fictional portrayals of the Tamil Nadu Police